Yang Bo (born July 8, 1973 in Ningbo, Zhejiang) is a Chinese gymnast. She is widely regarded as one of the greatest gymnasts ever on the balance beam, for which she created a move known as the "Yang Bo", which is rated as a D element in the Code of Points. Although widely renowned for her work on beam, Yang often had difficulty with consistency which prevented her from medalling at several major competitions. She competed at the 1992 Summer Olympics, placing 25th in the all-around and 7th on the beam.  She won the 1990 World Cup Final on Balance Beam and won the bronze medal with her team at the 1989 World Championship.

At the 1989 World Championships in Stuttgart, Yang performed an innovative beam routine during the team and individual all-round competitions, where she placed 5th. In the event finals, she under-rotated her dismount and placed 7th with a score of 9.800.

In 1990, she competed at the Asian Games in Beijing, finishing 6th in the All-Around, 3rd on beam, and won the team all-around gold. Later that year, she won the beam title at the World Cup Final in Brussels. At the 1991 World Championships, she placed 5th in the balance beam with a score of 9.887 after taking multiple steps on her dismount.

Yang was on the Chinese 1992 Summer Olympic team. The Chinese team placed 4th. Individually, she placed 13th in the all-around after a fall on bars. She also qualified in 6th place to the balance beam finals, where she fell during her layout series, though was able to stick the landing of her dismount.  She placed 7th in that event with a score of 9.300. Her teammate, Lu Li and American gymnast Shannon Miller tied with a 9.912 to win a silver medal while Tatiana Lysenko won gold with a 9.975.

Yang retired from gymnastics in 1993 and pursued her university studies in journalism.  She went on to enter show business and has been seen in TV shows with singing and acting performances in the 2000s (decade).

Eponymous skill
Yang has one eponymous skill listed in the Code of Points.

References

Sources

Animation of Yang Bo performing the move, named after her
Video of a Yang Bo leap

1973 births
Living people
Chinese female artistic gymnasts
Gymnasts at the 1992 Summer Olympics
Medalists at the World Artistic Gymnastics Championships
Olympic gymnasts of China
Originators of elements in artistic gymnastics
Sportspeople from Ningbo
Gymnasts from Zhejiang
Singers from Zhejiang
Musicians from Ningbo
Asian Games medalists in gymnastics
Gymnasts at the 1990 Asian Games
Asian Games gold medalists for China
Asian Games bronze medalists for China
Medalists at the 1990 Asian Games
21st-century Chinese women singers